Schönhauser Allee in Berlin is one of the most important streets of the Prenzlauer Berg district.

Schönhauser Allee begins at Rosa-Luxemburg-Platz in the south and ends at Schonensche Straße in the north. Many of the side streets of Schönhauser Allee are named after Scandinavian cities as Bornholmer Straße and Kopenhagener Straße. The street was named after the Schönhausen Palace in Pankow.

The Berlin U-Bahn line U2 follows the boulevard on an elevated railway.

References

Pankow
Shopping districts and streets in Germany
Streets in Berlin